Izone commonly refers to the South Korean idol girl group Iz*One.

Izone or iZone may refer to:
 Izone, Rolleston, a business park in the Selwyn District in New Zealand
 Polaroid i-Zone, instant camera products
 iZone, a WiFi hotspot system in Etisalat, UAE
 iZone, an eyewear business in Massachusetts with stores listed at exits on the Massachusetts Turnpike 

 Innovation zone
 A program in New York City Public Schools, as referenced in Globaloria